The pararayki is a long-necked lute played by the Ainu people of the Kuril Islands. It generally has three strings, and is based upon the Russian balalaika.

See also
Ainu music

References

Ainu musical instruments
Russian musical instruments
String instruments